Rhodes International Airport "Diagoras" (Greek: Διεθνής Αερολιμένας Ρόδου "Διαγόρας"), or Diagoras International Airport , is located on the West side of the island of Rhodes in Greece. The facility is located just north of the village Paradeisi, about 14 km southwest of the capital city, Rodos. Rhodes International Airport was the fourth busiest airport in Greece as of 2019, with 5,542,567 passengers utilizing the airport.

History 

Civil aviation on Rhodes started after the Second World War, on the location of the nearby military Rhodes Maritsa Airport.

This was the island's main airport until 1977, when the new Rhodes International Airport was opened. The need for a new facility was big, as the 'old' Maritsa airport did not meet the needs for a modern civil airport. The new "Diagoras" airport was built in 1977. It was decided that, on this location, it would meet the needs of the island better.

Improvements have been made to the airport, like expansion of taxiways, platform and airport buildings. The most recent upgrade is a new passenger terminal, opened in 2005, to accommodate the growing number of charter flights and passengers. The airport's plants currently cover a total area of 60,000 m2

On 21 September 2015, Rhodes Airport was closed for 14 hours after a 'sinkhole' appeared in the runway. Flights were diverted to surrounding airports such as Kos and Heraklion as well as Athens and the runway was fixed and reopened the following day.

In December 2015, the privatisation of Rhodes International Airport and 13 other regional airports of Greece was finalised with the signing of the agreement between the Fraport AG/Copelouzos Group joint venture and the state privatisation fund. "We signed the deal today," the head of Greece's privatisation agency HRADF, Stergios Pitsiorlas, told Reuters. According to the agreement, the joint venture will operate the 14 airports (including Rhodes International Airport) for 40 years as of autumn 2016.

Facilities

Terminal
Rhodes Airport terminal is actually 2 separate buildings with a joined corridor in the middle. Departures are served both in ground (check-ins, baggage checks) and first floor (passenger screening, gates, shops) while arrivals are served only in ground floor's southern corner where passport control, customs and baggage reclaim operate. Airport does not have air bridges so boarding and disembarking require the use of buses.

Both terminals are and will be under renovations for the next couple of years from Fraport as a series of chronic problems need to be addressed. Toilets and air conditioning system were first to be fixed while more complicated works including new check in  facilities that will eliminate double checks for baggage as well interior remodeling will proceed gradually during low traffic winter months.

Airport also hosts all necessary services such as a police station, a medical clinic, airline and handlers offices, rent-a-car and tour operators kiosks, VIP halls as well recently refurbished duty-free shops, cafes and restaurants.

Runway
The airport's single runway direction is 065/245 degrees (designated as 06/24), having a length of 3,305 meters and a width of 60 meters. There are two taxiways and four taxi links connecting the runway with the apron. The apron with the new pushback configuration can accommodate up to 20 ICAO reference category C or smaller airplanes, simultaneously. Three parking positions have MARS (Multiple Apron Ramp System) capability and can accommodate larger category D and E aircraft, such as the Airbus A330, A340 and A350 and the Boeing 747, 757, 767, 777 and 787. There is a small general aviation apron with three dedicated positions for small propelled or jet aircraft.

Future of the Airport - Fraport Greece’s investment plan 

On 22 March 2017, the Fraport-Greece presented its master plan for the 14 regional airports including the International Airport of Rhodes.

The following summarizes the enhancement changes that started in November 2017 and will be implemented for Rhodes International Airport under Fraport Greece's investment plan:
Immediate actions that were implemented at the airports as soon as Fraport Greece took over operations and before the launch of the 2017 Summer season included:
General clean-up
Improving lighting, marking of airside areas.
Upgrading sanitary facilities
Enhancing services and offering new free Internet connection (WiFi)
Implementing works to improve fire safety in all the areas of the airports
Remodeling the current terminal 
Reorganizing the airport apron area
New fire station
13 percent increase in the number of check-in counters (from 40 to 45)
13 percent increase in the number of departure gates (from 16 to 18)
71 percent in the number of security-check lanes (from 7 to 12)
25 percent increase in the number of baggage reclaim belts (from 4 to 5)

Airlines and destinations
The following airlines operate regular scheduled and charter flights at Rhodes Airport:

Traffic figures

Figures are taken from the Hellenic Civil Aviation Authority (CAA)  until 2016 and since 2017 from the official website of the airport.

Traffic statistics by country (2022)

Transport 

Public bus: Bus service is provided between the Airport and the city of Rhodes (No 23-35). Bus stop is located between the new and the old terminal.

Taxi: Taxi service is available outside Rhodes Airport arrivals hall.

Car: Rhodes Airport is located 14 km from the city of Rhodes and is accessible from the provincial road Rhodes-Kamiros.

Private Transfers: High level private transfers available without waiting at airport.

See also
List of the busiest airports in Greece
Transport in Greece

References

External links
 
 Official website
Greek Airport Guide: Rodos Airport, "Diagoras"
Airport information for LGRP. Data current as of October 2011.

Airports in Greece
Airport